Ex-fan des sixties is an album by Jane Birkin. The album was released in 1978. All songs on the album were wrote by Serge Gainsbourg and produced by Philippe Lerichomme. "Dépressive" was inspired by "Sonate n°8, opus 13" by Ludwig van Beethoven. Jane has said that she had difficulties recording the album and that they had to stop recording and start again six months later.

Track listing

Personnel
Jane Birkin - vocals
Brian Odgers - bass
Dougie Wright - drums
Jim Lawless - percussion
Alan Hawkshaw - arrangements, conductor
Technical
Peter Olliff - engineer
Serge Gainsbourg - artwork
André Berg - photography

References

External links
 
 Jane Birkin "Ex fan des sixties"`(official live) | Archive INA (title song) on YouTube

Jane Birkin albums
1978 albums
Fontana Records albums